Thomas Starling may refer to:

Thomas Starling Sullivant, cartoonist
Tom Starling, fictional character going under the alias Cass Cromwell in Outcasts (TV series)